The 1974–75 FA Vase was the first season of the FA Vase, an annual football competition for teams in the lower reaches of the English football league system.

Hoddesdon Town won the competition, beating Epsom & Ewell in the final.

Quarter-finals

Semi-finals

Hoddesdon Town won 3–1 on aggregate.

Epsom & Ewell won 2–1 on aggregate.

Final

References

FA Vase
FA Vase
FA Vase seasons